The Cyclin D/Cdk4 complex is a multi-protein structure consisting of the proteins Cyclin D and cyclin-dependent kinase 4, or Cdk4, a serine-threonine kinase. This complex is one of many cyclin/cyclin-dependent kinase complexes that are the "hearts of the cell-cycle control system"  and govern the cell cycle and its progression.  As its name would suggest, the cyclin-dependent kinase is only active and able to phosphorylate its substrates when it is bound by the corresponding cyclin.  The Cyclin D/Cdk4 complex is integral for the progression of the cell from the Growth 1 phase to the Synthesis phase of the cell cycle, for the Start or G1/S checkpoint.

Basic Mechanism

Under non-dividing conditions (when the cell is in the G0 phase of the cell cycle), Retinoblastoma protein (Rb) is bound with the E2F transcription factor. Once Cdk4 is activated and is bound with Cyclin D, the Cyclin D/Cdk4 complex phosphorylates Retinoblastoma protein (pRb).  Once the Retinoblastoma protein has been phosphorylated, E2F is released. The released E2F is then free to act as a transcription factor and it subsequently binds to DNA promoter regions and activates the expression of proteins required in the next stages of the cell cycle and in DNA replication. Specifically, E2F helps to activate Cyclin E and Cyclin A, which are constituents of other Cdk/Cyclin complexes and are involved in the DNA replication process and other downstream mitotic processes.

Regulation
There are multiple regulation points within this signaling pathway. First and foremost, under non-dividing conditions multiple proteins can inhibit the Cyclin D/Cdk4 complex by binding Cdk4 and inhibiting its association with Cyclin D. Primarily, this is accomplished by p27 but it can also be done by p16 and p21. However, this pathway is stimulated by the upstream binding of growth factors (GF), either from within the cell itself or from neighboring cells.  Stimulation by growth factors activates any of a number of receptor tyrosine kinase (RTK) proteins.  These receptor tyrosine kinases in turn phosphorylate and activate many other proteins, including Fos/Jun/Myc and phosphatidylinositol 3 kinase (PI-3-K). Fos/Jun/Myc helps to activate the Cyclin D/Cdk4 complex. Phosphatidylinositol 3 kinase phosphorylates p27 (or p16 or p21) and SCF/Skp1.  The phosphorylation of p27 inhibits p27's ability to bind Cdk4, thus freeing Cdk4 to associate with Cyclin D and form an active complex.  SCF/Skp1 (an E3 ubiquitin ligase) helps to further inhibit p27 and thus further help activate the Cyclin D/Cdk4 complex.  Also, p27 acts as an inhibitor of Cyclin E and Cyclin A.  So, its inhibition also facilitates the activation of downstream mitotic processes, as noted above.

There are also other peripheral regulators of the Cyclin D/Cdk4 complex. In megakaryocytes, it is regulated by the GATA-1 transcription factor.  GATA-1 serves as an activating transcription factor of Cyclin D and potentially also as a repressor of the Cyclin D inhibitor, p16. Cdk4 also requires activation upon complex assembly with Cyclin D. This is accomplished by a Cdk activating kinase (CAK), which phosphorylates Cdk4 at threonine 172.

Cancer
The function of the Cyclin D/Cdk4 complex suggests an obvious link to cancer and tumorigenesis. A hallmark of cancer is the downregulation of such inhibitory proteins as p53 and p27. Following the downregulation of p27, Cdk4 would be uninhibited and constitutively active, resulting in the uncontrolled progression through the G1/S checkpoint, eventually leading to the excessive cell growth and division observed in cancer.

See also
 Human papillomavirus

References

Cell cycle
Human proteins
Protein complexes
Transcription factors

es:Ciclina D/Cdk4